Noah Richard "Red" Proctor (October 27, 1900 – December 17, 1954) was a Major League Baseball pitcher who played for the Chicago White Sox in . He pitched in two games, pitching in 4.0 innings.

External links

1900 births
1954 deaths
Chicago White Sox players
Major League Baseball pitchers
Baseball players from Virginia
Sportspeople from Williamsburg, Virginia
Suffolk Nuts players